Deborah Ann Gibson (born August 31, 1970) is an American singer-songwriter, record producer and actress.

Gibson released her debut album Out of the Blue in 1987, which spawned several international hits, later being certified triple platinum by the Recording Industry Association of America. One of those singles, "Foolish Beat", made Gibson the youngest female artist to write, produce, and perform a Billboard Hot 100 number-one single. Her double-platinum second album Electric Youth (1989), gave Gibson another U.S. number-one hit with "Lost in Your Eyes". Gibson is the sole songwriter on all of her singles to reach the top 20 of the Billboard Hot 100. She was recognized by ASCAP as Songwriter of the Year, along with Bruce Springsteen, in 1989.

Gibson continued to record and release music throughout the 1990s and 2000s. In 2006, she reached number 24 on the U.S. adult contemporary chart with "Say Goodbye", a duet with Jordan Knight, and in 2017 achieved her highest-charting hit in more than 25 years in her duet with Sir Ivan, "I Am Peaceman". Gibson's 2020 single "Girls Night Out" became her first top five and highest-charting hit after 30 years. In addition to music, she has gone on to starring roles on Broadway and touring musicals, including playing Eponine in Les Misérables and Sandy in Grease, as well as television and independent film work.

Early life
Gibson was born on Long Island, New York, on August 31, 1970, the third of Diane (née Pustizzi) and Joseph Gibson's four daughters. Her father, who enjoyed singing, was originally named Joseph Schultz and was orphaned as a boy; his biological mother married a man with the surname Gibson before putting Joseph into an orphanage. Gibson grew up in suburban Merrick, New York, on Long Island. She describes herself as of "Italian/Sicilian and part German and possibly some Russian" descent. She studied piano under American pianist Morton Estrin.

Gibson is a graduate of Sanford H. Calhoun High School.

Music career

In 1983, Gibson submitted a cassette recording of her original composition "I Come From America" to WOR for the station's song contest. After she won a cash prize of 1,000 from the contest, her mother convinced a relative to loan her 10,000 to convert the family garage into a recording studio.

1986–1989

After years of writing and producing her own material, a demonstration tape of Gibson's submitted to a radio personality was eventually shared with an executive at Atlantic Records. Based solely on Gibson's original song, "Only in My Dreams", she was signed to a development deal and began a promotional tour of club venues throughout the United States.

Gibson spent much of 1986 and the beginning of 1987 building her songwriting catalog, while continuing to play club dates. During her promotional tour, Gibson continued attending classes at Calhoun High School in Merrick, New York, where she later graduated as an honor student. Diane Gibson, Debbie's mother and manager, accompanied her daughter on many of these track dates. "We played dance clubs, straight clubs, and gay clubs," Diane has said.

The single "Only in My Dreams" was released in December 1986 and landed in the Billboard Hot 100 chart beginning in May 1987, peaking at number four that September. Atlantic Records and Gibson worked to complete her first album as a result of the good showing by the single.

Following the success of "Only In My Dreams", "Shake Your Love" was released as the follow-up single and reached the Billboard top five. The "Shake Your Love" video was choreographed by Paula Abdul and was the first time MTV had visited Gibson on a video shoot.

In 1987, while performing at nightclubs throughout the United States, Gibson recorded her debut album, Out of the Blue. Along with producer Fred Zarr, Gibson wrote, recorded, and produced it in four weeks. Four singles from the album reached the top five of the Hot 100 chart: "Only in My Dreams", "Shake Your Love", "Out of the Blue", and the number-one hit "Foolish Beat", followed by "Staying Together", which performed more modestly, reaching number 22. "Foolish Beat" set a record, making Gibson at 16 the youngest artist to write, produce, and perform a Billboard number-one single, as cited in the 1988 Guinness Book of World Records. She remains the youngest female artist to have done so. Out of the Blue became a hit album, and she had success in the UK and southeast Asia, filling stadiums with her Out of the Blue tour. By the end of 1988, Out of the Blue had gone triple platinum.

The music video compilation Out of the Blue was certified platinum by the RIAA; the concert tour video was certified double platinum. In October 1988, Gibson sang the national anthem for Game 1 of the Major League Baseball World Series.

Electric Youth was released in early 1989 and spent five weeks at number one on the Billboard 200. The first single released, "Lost in Your Eyes", was number one on the Hot 100 for three weeks, garnering her another achievement as the youngest female to have both an album and single simultaneously at number one. She shared the 1989 ASCAP Songwriter of the Year Award with Bruce Springsteen. Subsequent singles from the album were "Electric Youth" (number 11), "No More Rhyme" (number 17), and "We Could Be Together" (number 71). The Electric Youth album was certified double platinum by the RIAA. The successful Electric Youth world tour and Live Around the World VHS (double platinum) followed.

1990–2001
She recorded two more albums for Atlantic Records: Anything Is Possible (1990) and Body, Mind, Soul (1993). The former's title song, co-written with Motown mainstay Lamont Dozier, peaked at number 26 on Billboard'''s Hot 100 in 1991. Subsequent singles from Anything Is Possible failed to chart on the Hot 100, although "One Step Ahead" scored on the Hot Maxi Singles and Hot Dance charts, peaking at numbers 21 and 18, respectively.

During this time, Gibson was part of the supergroup that recorded the charity single "Voices That Care", which peaked at number 11 on the Hot 100 chart.

In 1992, she contributed a version of "Sleigh Ride" to the charity album A Very Special Christmas 2 which hit #7 on the Billboard album chart and was certified Double Platinum for shipment of two million copies.

In 1995, she signed with EMI's SBK Records division and recorded her only album for the label, Think with Your Heart. It was an adult contemporary-heavy album consisting of piano and keyboard ballads recorded predominantly with the London Philharmonic Orchestra. The album's producer, Niko Bolas, who was usually Neil Young's co-producer, was producing the reunion album for Circle Jerks (a veteran punk band) and invited Gibson to a recording session for that band's album. She sang background vocals on the song "I Wanna Destroy You", as well as appearing at and participating in the Circle Jerks' performance at the punk venue CBGB wearing one of the band's T-shirts and sharing a microphone with frontman Keith Morris.

In 1998, she sang the song, "I Do", which is featured on the soundtrack to the film, The Naked Man. The lyrics to the song were composed by the co-writer of the film, Ethan Coen. The soundtrack has never been released.

After parting company with EMI, Gibson formed her own record label, Espiritu, to release her original material. Her sixth album, Deborah (1997), marked her full return to pop. Deborah includes the lead single "Only Words". "Only Words" (Dance Edit) became a Top-40 Hot Dance Music/Club Play hit. The album's other single was the ballad "Naturally". Though it only sold 20,000 in the US, Deborah remains well-respected. 

In 2001, she released her seventh album on her new record label, Golden Egg, titled M.Y.O.B.  It featured three singles: the sensual pop song "What You Want", the Latin-infused dance-pop song "Your Secret", and the bass-heavy "M.Y.O.B." Highlights from the album include the sultry Latin-flavored smooth jazz song "In Blue", a vintage-style ballad "Wishing You Were Here", "Jaded", and a remix of "M.Y.O.B." with the background vocals of her two nieces.

2005–2009
In 2005, Gibson co-wrote and recorded a song titled "Someone You Love" with the O'Neill Brothers. With the brothers, she released an updated, acoustic version of her number-one hit "Lost in Your Eyes". An Emmy-nominated PBS special aired in 2005.

The March 2005 issue of Playboy featured a nude pictorial of Gibson, coinciding with the release of her single, "Naked". She has said that the magazine had asked her five times to pose for them since she turned 18. She agreed to pose to revamp her image, describing how one casting call called her agent, not realizing that Gibson had long since outgrown her teenager image. The single peaked at No. 35 on the Billboard Hot Single Sales chart in March 2005.

In 2006, Gibson went on tour with the O'Neill Brothers for "Someone You Love Tour" in 2006. "Lost in Your Eyes" was revamped with an acoustic sound and a song "Someone You Love" was written and performed by Gibson and the O'Neill Brothers. These two songs also appeared on the O'Neill Brothers album Someone You Love.

She had a resurgence of popularity in niche markets. Her single "Your Secret" came back from its dormant state and became popular on some radio stations, including Super 91.7 WMPH in Wilmington, Delaware. "Your Secret" has been on their request show, Total Control Radio, for 12 months; it reached No. 1 on its third week on that station's chart in May 2006. It charted along with a few of her other singles, "M.Y.O.B." and "Only Words" (Dance Edit), the Eurodance mix. They all have become recurrent hits on WMPH.

The 2006 single, "Say Goodbye", featuring dance-pop artist Jordan Knight, made an impression in the Soft AC and Hot AC radio formats, becoming the third-most added single during summer, 2006. It debuted at number 35 on the Hot Contemporary chart, peaking at number 24 in early September. The same year, Gibson appeared in the independent film Coffee Date with Wilson Cruz and Jonathan Silverman and provided a soundtrack song called "Sounds Like Love".

On November 14, 2006, Gibson released the song "Famous" on her official website. The song was written by Gibson and Tiziano Lugli and was produced by Lugli.

In May 2007, the world premiere of Electric Youth: The Musical was unveiled at the Starlight Theatre in Orlando, Florida. The musical featured 14 of Gibson's songs and was directed by Dean Parker. On August 24, 2007, Gibson and Frankie Avalon hosted Time-Life Presents Dick Clark's American Bandstand 50th Anniversary Collection.

In September 2007, Gibson considered creating a camp on the West Coast. She is the founder and creator of Camp Electric Youth, a children's summer day camp, which ran from July 7–18, 2008. It claims to be the first camp of its kind in the Los Angeles area. The camp was reportedly attended by "over 120 talented singers, actors, and dancers" from around the world.

Gibson was a judge for the online talent competition, Total Pop Star, along with Andrew Van Slee (producer and judge) and Joey Lawrence (from Blossom). The first season ran from November 12, 2007 – May 30, 2008, though it was later extended to June. The show ended abruptly during its second season.

In May 2008, Gibson performed her 1980s hits, along with her Broadway role songs, during a three-run week at Harrah's in Atlantic City, New Jersey.

She later appeared on the April 2008 cover of Lavender Magazine (an LGBT magazine in Minnesota) and was interviewed about her career and upcoming projects. Then on the 24th, Gibson hosted and performed on Spotlightlive '80s Karaoke Experience in New York singing songs such as "Only in My Dreams", "Out of the Blue", "Love Shack" (an original hit for the B-52's) and "9 to 5". She performed with Samantha Fox, Tiffany, & Rick Astley at the Colisée Pepsi in Quebec City, Canada, on April 10, 2009.

On March 9, 2009, Gibson released a new song called "Already Gone" on her official website and reverberation, written by Gibson and produced by Fred Coury. It was accompanied by a music video, released on March 13, 2009, produced by Guy Birtwhistle and directed by John Knowles, which starred Birtwhistle, Gibson, and Steve Valentine.

2010–present
In January 2010, an unofficial clip named "Cougar" was uploaded on YouTube. She also became a spokesperson for Murad's Resurgence Skin Care and plays piano and sings a line of the song called "Cougar".

Gibson's song "Rise", from the documentary 3 Billion and Counting, was included on the shortlist for an Academy Award for Best Song in a Film in 2010. In the summer of 2011, she released Rise on iTunes, and also performed it on Good Morning America in New York.

Gibson performed as Mother Nature in Cirque Dreams Jungle Fantasy at Foxwoods/MGM Casino from July 27 to September 1, 2010.

In 2010, the album Ms. Vocalist, released via Sony Japan, reached the Top 10 on the Japanese Billboard chart. Gibson covered J-Pop tunes for the album that were originally sung by Japanese artists such as Chage and Aska ("Say Yes"), Yutaka Ozaki ("I love you"), Sekaiju no Dareyori Kitto (by Miho Nakayama and WANDS) among others, plus Japanese/English version of her number-one hit "Lost in Your Eyes" and a duet with Eric Martin.  The first single from the album, "I Love You", hit No. 1 on the international cable radio chart. On November 3, 2010, "I Love You", the first single from her 2010 album , reached number one 

In January 2011, Gibson wrote, performed, and produced the song "Snake Charmer" for the film Mega Python vs. Gatoroid.

During the summer of 2011  Gibson toured with fellow 1980s pop princess Tiffany Darwish. In June 2011, Gibson appeared in Katy Perry's music video "Last Friday Night (T.G.I.F.)" alongside several other guest stars.

On August 27, 2016, Gibson starred in an original Hallmark Channel film, Summer of Dreams, about a former pop star, trying to make a comeback, who finds herself better suited as a school's choir director. She also recorded a song titled "Wonderland" for the film.

In June 2017, Billboard Gibson achieved her highest-charting hit in more than 25 years in her duet with Sir Ivan on "I Am Peaceman", which hit number 26 on the Billboard Dance Club chart.

In June 2018, Gibson appeared in the music video of American heavy-metal band Voices of Extreme's cover version of "Foolish Beat".

In March 2019, Gibson hosted a special program on SiriusXM Radio's '80s on 8 channel to celebrate the 30th anniversary of her Electric Youth album, during which she played each song from the album in sequence, accompanied by personal stories surrounding each song.

On May 2, the Mixtape Tour commenced in Cincinnati, Ohio. Performers on this tour include Gibson, Tiffany, Salt-N-Pepa, and Naughty by Nature, with New Kids on the Block  billed as the headline performers. The tour grossed $53.2 million and sold 662,911 tickets over 55 dates.

On June 7, 2019, Gibson released a new pop anthem "Girls Night Out". The music video for "Girls Night Out" was shot in Las Vegas, Nevada. The song peaked at number four on the Billboard Dance Club chart.

On August 20, 2021, Gibson released the album The Body Remembers, her first studio recording of original songs since M.Y.O.B.. It contained a new version of "Lost in Your Eyes" with Joey McIntyre.

Theatre
Gibson debuted on Broadway in 1992, playing Eponine in Les Misérables. She then went to London and starred as Sandy in Grease—a role for which 800 other people tried out before producers chose Gibson—in a West End production. The show broke box office sales records. The single version of "You're the One That I Want", a duet with Craig McLachlan, taken from the original cast recording, reached number 13 on the UK Singles Chart in 1993.

On returning to the States, she appeared in the Broadway touring production, this time playing Rizzo. She played Fanny Brice in a revamped Funny Girl tour. She has had many successful theatre credits; she was among the many actresses who took the starring role of Belle in the Broadway production of Beauty and the Beast. She replaced Kerry Butler in September 1997 and was in the show until June 1998, when Kim Huber then succeeded her.Belle Tolls For Kim Huber: She's The New Broadway Beauty, June 30 Playbill, June 30, 1998 She also starred in the critically lauded production of Gypsy (in a production staged at the Paper Mill Playhouse). Gibson starred as Louise opposite Broadway legend Betty Buckley. She participated in the national tour of Joseph and the Amazing Technicolor Dreamcoat, where she played the Narrator, and starred as Cinderella in the national tour of Rodgers & Hammerstein's musical with Eartha Kitt as the Fairy Godmother. In October 2002, she starred as Velma Kelly in the Boston production of Chicago. In 2003, she played Sally Bowles in the Broadway revival of Cabaret. From March to April 2004, she played the role of Marta in the UCLA Reprise! production of Company.

Gibson starred as Anna Leonowens in Cabrillo Music Theatre's production of the Richard Rodgers and Oscar Hammerstein II musical The King and I, which began October 17, 2008, in the Kavli Theatre at the Thousand Oaks Civic Arts Plaza and ran through October 26.

Film and television
Gibson co-hosted Nickelodeon's first Kids' Choice Awards in 1988, alongside Tony Danza, Brian Robbins, and Dan Schneider.

Gibson co-starred with actor Lorenzo Lamas in the low-budget action/adventure film Mega Shark Versus Giant Octopus, produced by The Asylum and released on May 19, 2009. The film drew in 2 million viewers on Syfy in 2009. Its trailer became a viral hit, scoring over one million hits on MTV.com and YouTube. The film premiered at the 2009 Cannes Film Festival. Gibson's former music rival Tiffany had her film Necrosis (or Blood Snow) premiere at the Cannes, as well. Gibson and Tiffany starred in a Syfy original movie entitled Mega Python vs. Gatoroid, aired on January 29, 2011. The pairing was suggested by Tiffany, who wanted to play-off their supposed rivalry. Gibson reprised her role as Emma McNeil in the 2014 film Mega Shark Versus Mecha Shark.

She starred in the UP TV movie called The Music in Me alongside Gloria Reuben in 2015. The film also featured an original song called "Promises", written and performed by Gibson.

In mid-2003, Gibson was a judge on the American Idol spin-off American Juniors, which lasted one season. In January 2006, she joined the cast of Skating with Celebrities on Fox Television, partnered with Canadian former world-champion figure skater Kurt Browning. She was voted out in the third episode.

Gibson competed on the fifth season of The Celebrity Apprentice, which began airing on February 19, 2012. On the fourth task, she won $50,000 for her charity, Children International. Gibson was fired on April 1, 2012, in the seventh task because she had brought in the least amount of money between her teammates in the boardroom, Dayana Mendoza and Teresa Giudice. While both Mendoza and Giudice were arguably weaker candidates going forward, given that Mendoza was cited as the women's weakest link and Giudice had failed the task as project manager, Gibson was fired, instead.

In 2017, Gibson was one of the celebrities competing on the 25th season of Dancing with the Stars. She was paired with first-time pro-dancer, Alan Bersten. On September 26, 2017, Gibson and Bersten were the second couple eliminated coming in 12th place.

In September 2018, Gibson starred in the Hallmark Channel film Wedding of Dreams, a sequel to 2016's Summer of Dreams.In 2019 and 2020, Gibson was a judge on Nickelodeon's America's Most Musical Family.

Gibson made a guest appearance on season 5 episode 10 of the Netflix series Lucifer, which premiered on May 28, 2021. In the episode titled "Bloody Celestial Karaoke Jam", she plays a mother who sings "Every Breath You Take" with Lucifer (Tom Ellis) in an interrogation room.

In 2023, Gibson competed in season nine of The Masked Singer as "Night Owl". She was eliminated on "ABBA Night" alongside Howie Mandel as "Rock Lobster".

Image and influence
In tandem with the second album, she created a perfume called Electric Youth that was distributed by Revlon, as well as other makeup essentials for young girls that were distributed nationwide through Natural Wonder Cosmetics. Gibson's trademark was her hats, usually a black pork-pie style. She also made popular wearing tight, rolled-up jeans, vests over a T-shirt, friendship bracelets and two Swatch watches as on the back cover of her popular album Electric Youth and in her music video "Staying Together". Her influences were Madonna and Olivia Newton-John, though she has often stated she admires Elton John and Billy Joel as favorite artists and was asked to sing and perform live with both at the former's Madison Square Garden concert, which she did. Gibson appeared on the covers of numerous teen magazines such as Tiger Beat.

Personal life
Gibson had a history of panic attacks since the age of 16.

Over the years, Gibson has been the target of stalkers. Robert Bardo, who was convicted of murdering actress Rebecca Schaeffer in 1989, had a wall in his house adorned with pictures of Gibson and Tiffany Darwish. In May 1998, Michael Falkner, a disgruntled fan from Eau Claire, Wisconsin, was arrested outside Manhattan's Palace Theater, where Gibson was performing in the live-musical adaptation of Disney's Beauty and the Beast. This was after Gibson received threatening letters, emails, and faxes from Falkner, who used the alias 'Starcade'. In 2008, Gibson filed for a restraining order against Spanish taxi driver Jorge Puigdollers, who had stalked her since 2002. However, a temporary restraining order was not issued, and a court date was set to determine if a restraining order was appropriate. The proceeding was dismissed when Gibson failed to show up for the hearing.

Gibson was once engaged to Jonathan Kanterman and was in a  relationship with Rutledge Taylor from 2008 to 2019.

In 2014, in response to fans' concern about her weight loss, Gibson stated she had developed symptoms of Lyme disease in early 2013.

In 2016, Gibson appeared on Oprah: Where Are They Now?, where she spoke out about her drug use in the past, after the death of singer Prince:

I really feel like I haven't fully articulated it till now and really spoke candidly till now... When I heard the news about Prince and the fact that it might have been prescription drug-related, I really had a moment of, like, "That's awful and that's sad – and I can relate." And, unfortunately, 90% of the entertainment community can relate. I remember being on the road at, like, 25, touring with theater and doing my own cocktail of Tylenol PM and Xanax. It's like, "Oh, I found a way to make the Xanax last longer with the Tylenol PM. I mean, it's as simple as that, and that is how performers get in so much trouble."

Discography

 Out of the Blue (1987)
 Electric Youth (1989)
 Anything Is Possible (1990)
 Body, Mind, Soul (1993)
 Think with Your Heart (1995)
 Deborah (1997)
 M.Y.O.B. (2001)
 Colored Lights: The Broadway Album (2003)
 Ms. Vocalist (2010)
 The Body Remembers (2021)
 Winterlicious (2022)

Filmography

Film
1984: Ghostbusters (uncredited)
1986: Sweet Liberty (uncredited "Amusement Park" scene)
1998: My Girlfriend's Boyfriend1999: My X-Girlfriend's Wedding Reception2001: Wedding Band 
2001: Soulkeeper 
2006: Coffee Date 
2007: Body/Antibody 
2009: Mega Shark Versus Giant Octopus 
2011: Mega Python vs. Gatoroid 
2012: Rock of Ages2014: Mega Shark Versus Mecha Shark2022: The ClassTelevision
1991: Beverly Hills, 90210 (episode: "East Side Story")
1991: Street Justice (episode: in "Backbeat")
1995: Step by Step (episode: "Roadie" as Christi Rose)
1995: Kidsongs (episode: "Fun With Manners")
2002: That '80s Show as Janice (episode: "Beach Party")
2000: Maggie Bloom as Maggie Bloom  
2003: American Juniors as judge 
2004: Celeste in the City (TV movie)
2006: Skating with Celebrities 
2009: Rita Rocks (episode: "Old Friends")
2010: Celebrity Ghost Stories 
2012: Celebrity Apprentice2014: Acting Dead as Roberta (Recurring Role)
2014: Sing Your Face Off as judge     
2015: The Music in Me (TV movie)
2016: Summer of Dreams (TV movie)
2017: Dancing with the Stars2018: Wedding of Dreams (TV movie)
2019: America's Most Musical Family as judge
2021: Lucifer (episode: "Bloody Celestial Karaoke Jam")
2023: The Masked SingerAwards and nominations
1988: Billboard Year-End - Top Pop Album Artist Female 
1989: Debut Album of the Year – Out of the Blue – New York Music Awards
1989: Debut Artist of the Year – New York Music Awards
1989: ASCAP Songwriter of the Year 
1989: Nominated for Best Pop Female Vocalist – American Music Awards
1989: Billboard Year-End - Top Pop Album Artist Female (runner-up)
1990: Nominated Favorite Female Music Performer – People's Choice Awards
1990: Rock Producer of the Year – American Songwriter Awards
1990: Artist of the Year – New York Music Awards
1990: Song of the Year – "Lost in Your Eyes" – New York Music Awards
1990: Best Pop Female Vocalist – New York Music Awards
2014: Inductee – Long Island Music Hall of Fame 
2015: Nominated for Best Supporting Actress (comedy) in Acting Dead  Indie Series Awards2015: Lifetime Achievement Award – The PATH Fund's Rockers on Broadway
2018: 425th Golden Palm Star – Palm Springs Walk of Stars
2018: Named one of Billboard's'' Top 60 Female Artists of All-Time
2019: Recipient of the NGLCC / American Airlines ExtrAA Mile Award

References

External links

 
1970 births
Living people
20th-century American actresses
20th-century American singers
20th-century American women singers
20th-century women pianists
21st-century American actresses
21st-century American singers
21st-century American women singers
21st-century women pianists
Actresses from New York (state)
American child actresses
American child singers
American dance musicians
American women pop singers
American women singer-songwriters
American film actresses
American film producers
American freestyle musicians
American house musicians
American musical theatre actresses
American people of German descent
American people of Italian descent
American people of Russian descent
American stage actresses
American television actresses
Television personalities from New York City
American women television personalities
American women film producers
American women in electronic music
American women pianists
American women record producers
Atlantic Records artists
The Apprentice (franchise) contestants
Child pop musicians
Dance-pop musicians
Musicians from Brooklyn
Participants in American reality television series
People from Merrick, New York
Record producers from New York (state)
Sanford H. Calhoun High School alumni
SBK Records artists
Singer-songwriters from New York (state)
Sony Music Entertainment Japan artists